Andreea Voicu (born 16 January 1996) is a Romanian football defender currently playing for FCU Olimpia Cluj. She played most of her career in the First League for Olimpia Cluj, with which she has also played the Champions League. She made her debut for the Romanian national team at 16 in the 2013 European Championship qualifying against Switzerland.

Andrea was declared the best woman footballer playing in Romania in 2017 at the Association of Amateur and Non-amateur Footballers of Romania (AFAN) gala.

References

1996 births
Living people
Romanian women's footballers
Romania women's international footballers
Women's association football midfielders
FCU Olimpia Cluj players
Apollon Ladies F.C. players
Expatriate women's footballers in Cyprus
Romanian expatriate sportspeople in Cyprus